Lobeira may refer to:

 Lobeira, Spain, a town in Galicia. The Spanish name is Lobera ("wolves' lair", "wolf trap", "wolf woman").
 João de Lobeira (c.1233–1285), medieval Portuguese romance writer, author of Amadis de Gaul
 Vasco de Lobeira, soldier, author of Amadis de Gaul in one source
 Roberta Lobeira Alanís, Mexican visual artist
 Disocactus or Lobeira, a cactus genus
 Solanum lycocarpum, or lobeira, a species of flowering shrub. The plant is called lobeira ("Wolf's Plant") or fruta-do-lobo ("Wolf's Fruit") in Portuguese.

See also
 Lupăria (disambiguation)
 Lobería, town in Buenos Aires Province, Argentina